The Craig-Bryan House is a historic house at 307 West Central Avenue in Bentonville, Arkansas.  It is an eclectic two-story brick house, with several gabled wings, and projecting bay window sections.  Its front-facing gable ends are decorated with bargeboard, and there is a prominent three-story tower at the center with a shallow-pitch hip roof.  Its iron balconies were salvaged from the old Benton County Courthouse when it was demolished.  The house was built in 1875 by James Terrill Craig, and owned by members of the Bryan family for seven decades.

The house was listed on the National Register of Historic Places in 1988.

See also
National Register of Historic Places listings in Benton County, Arkansas

References

Houses on the National Register of Historic Places in Arkansas
Italianate architecture in Arkansas
Houses completed in 1875
Houses in Bentonville, Arkansas
National Register of Historic Places in Bentonville, Arkansas
Individually listed contributing properties to historic districts on the National Register in Arkansas
1875 establishments in Arkansas